Larkin is a state constituency in Johor, Malaysia, that is represented in the Johor State Legislative Assembly.

History

Polling districts 
According to the federal gazette issued on 30 March 2018, the Larkin constituency is divided into 23 polling districts.

Representation history

Election results

References 

Johor state constituencies